Maximilian Simonischek (born October 19, 1982 in Berlin) is an Austrian–Swiss actor. He is the son of the actors Peter Simonischek and Charlotte Schwab.

References

External links (in German)
  – Max Simonischek als ZDF-Fernsehkommissar Lukas Laim, Pressedokumentation 
  – Warum Simonischek das Theater bevorzugt, Das Magazin vom 6. August 2015 
  – Wenn er in der Erde wühlt, röchelt, sich die Haare rauft, wird Simonischek eins mit Kafkas Erzählung: Kritik der Neuen Zürcher Zeitung 
 Geliebt wird er nicht, lieben kann er nicht – Vorschau zu den Salzburger Festspielen in Die Presse vom 10. Juni 2014
 Max Simonischek Fanpage – Facebookseite des Schauspielers mit zahlreichen Interviews, Fotostrecken und Filmausschnitten sowie aktuellen Infos
 Webauftritt Filmmakers – zahlreiche Filmausschnitte mit Max Simonischek
 Max Simonischek auf der Seite pr-emami
 Den sollten Sie sich merken: Max Simonischek – Porträt in 20 Minuten vom 27. Februar 2014
 Tragende Rollen – Filmporträt in der Sendung „Glanz&Gloria“ des Schweizer Fernsehens
 Zeppelin-Absturz soll Quotenhoch bringen – Bericht zu den Hindenburg-Dreharbeiten bei morgenpost.de, 19. Januar 2011
 Ein begabter Bürdenträger – Porträt von Henrike Thomsen bei Spiegel Online, 26. Februar 2008

1982 births
Living people
Austrian male actors
Swiss male actors